William Ephraim Mikell (January 29, 1868  January 19, 1944) was an American legal scholar, lawyer and dean of the University of Pennsylvania Law School.

Biography
Mikell was born in Sumter, South Carolina, to Thomas Price and Rebecca (Moses) Mikell. He married Martha Turner McBee in 1894. He lived in Philadelphia and maintained a winter home in Charleston, South Carolina, and was buried in the city.

He graduated from South Carolina Military College (the Citadel) with a BS in 1890, and from the University of Virginia Law School in 1894. Mikell was admitted to the South Carolina Bar in 1894.

Mikell was Dean of the University of Pennsylvania Law School from 1915 to 1929. He had joined the law school faculty in 1897, and taught at the law school for 46 years.

He wrote a number of books on the law, primarily on criminal law.  The University of Pennsylvania has an archive with a collection of his papers.

Mikell is buried on Edisto Island at the Presbyterian Church on Edisto Island Cemetery in Charleston.

References 

19th-century American lawyers
University of Pennsylvania alumni
1944 deaths
The Citadel, The Military College of South Carolina alumni
People from Sumter, South Carolina
Burials in South Carolina
1868 births
Deans of University of Pennsylvania Law School
University of Virginia School of Law alumni
South Carolina lawyers
20th-century American lawyers